Thorius omiltemi is a species of salamander in the family Plethodontidae. It is endemic to the area around Omiltemi in the Sierra Madre del Sur of Guerrero, Mexico, at elevations of  asl.

It is a terrestrial salamander that inhabits pine-oak-fir cloud forest and pine-oak forest. It lives under the bark of fallen tree logs. It is threatened by habitat loss caused by agriculture, logging, and human settlement.

References

Endemic amphibians of Mexico
Thorius
Fauna of the Sierra Madre del Sur
Taxonomy articles created by Polbot
Amphibians described in 1999